Dante Delaneo Jones (born March 23, 1965 in Houston, Texas) is a former linebacker in the NFL who played for the Chicago Bears from 1988 to 1994 and Denver Broncos in 1995. As a Sooner, Jones was the 1987 Orange Bowl MVP. As a senior Jones was an All Big 8 selection, Big 8 defensive player of the year and consensus All American  at linebacker in 1987. Jones came in 3rd in the Butkus award voting.  He graduated in 1983 from Skyline High School in Dallas, Texas.

References

1965 births
Living people
All-American college football players
American football linebackers
Chicago Bears players
Denver Broncos players
Oklahoma Sooners football players
People from Dallas
Skyline High School (Dallas) alumni